Nuclear Power Plant Company Bangladesh Limited is a Bangladesh government owned company nuclear energy company responsible for building and operating nuclear power plants in Bangladesh.

History
Nuclear Power Plant Company Bangladesh Limited was established in September 2015 after the passage of Nuclear Power Plant Bill by the Parliament of Bangladesh. The bill was placed by Science and Technology Minister Yafes Osman. The parliament vote also removed amendments inserted by the opposition party.

Nuclear Power Plant Company Bangladesh Limited is a concern of the Bangladesh Atomic Energy Commission. It is responsible for the management of Rooppur Nuclear Power Plant.

References

Organisations based in Dhaka
Government-owned companies of Bangladesh
Nuclear power in Bangladesh
Non-renewable resource companies established in 2015
Bangladeshi companies established in 2015